Jérémy Kapone (born 16 April 1990) is a French actor, model, singer and songwriter, best known for his role in the French film LOL (Laughing Out Loud) as Maël.

He was a member of the band Kaponz & Spinoza and also wrote a song (Exil) for the movie LOL (Laughing Out Loud). 
He pursues a solo career with an EP, "Aquarium", which was released in May 2016.

Filmography

Films

Television

Accolades
 Festival du Film de Cabourg : « Swann d'Or » Most Promising Male Newcomer 2009 for LOL.

References

External links 
 

1990 births
Living people
French male television actors
French songwriters
Male songwriters
French male film actors
21st-century French male actors
21st-century French singers
21st-century French male singers